The Night Manager is an espionage novel by British writer John le Carré, published in 1993. It is his first post-Cold War novel, detailing an undercover operation to bring down a major international arms dealer.

Plot summary
Jonathan Pine, a former British soldier, is a night manager at a hotel. Pine has a complex character with a military background and schooling at the Duke of York's Royal Military School in Dover. We first meet him in that capacity at the Hotel Meister Palace in Zurich. He is on duty when the "worst man in the world", Richard Onslow Roper, arrives with his entourage on a cold, blizzardy night. Roper is a billionaire criminal who traffics illegal arms and drugs. The novel is about Pine's preoccupation with undoing Roper's criminal enterprise, which began earlier, in Cairo, where Pine was working as the night manager at the luxurious Queen Nefertiti hotel.

One night in Cairo, Pine met Sophie, a French-Arab woman, the mistress of the hotel owner, Freddie Hamid, who had ties to Roper. Sophie characterised Roper as "the worst man in the world". She provided Pine with incriminating documents, asking him to forward them to the Egyptian authorities. Pine did so but disregarded her warning that Roper had ties to British intelligence. He forwarded copies to a friend with MI6. A short time later, Sophie was murdered.

Several years later, Pine is working in Switzerland. He is approached by ex-SIS Chief Leonard Burr and his senior civil servant backer Rex Goodhew, who have set up a small counter arms-proliferation office and are planning an elaborate sting operation against Roper. Eager to avenge Sophie, Pine agrees to go undercover to infiltrate Roper's vast criminal empire. All the while, however, the operation is jeopardised by an inter-agency turf war within the intelligence community, with a suspicion that collusion with Roper is taking place somewhere.

Burr's operation, a joint effort between his group and sympathetic American colleagues, is code-named "Limpet." The first stage requires Pine to fabricate a criminal identity and cover story and head to the Bahamas, the location of Roper's primary residence. Pine wins the confidence of Roper by "rescuing" his son from a phony kidnapping orchestrated by Burr and suffering a severe beating from the "kidnappers". When Pine recovers, Roper recruits him into his organisation, in preparation for his latest and largest illegal arms deal, with a Colombian drug cartel.

Unknown to Pine, another part of Operation Limpet is that the cartel's lawyer, Dr. Paul Apostoll, is secretly an informant for the American FBI and DEA. He explains to Burr that Roper has convinced the cartel to organise its bands of enforcers along the lines of a professional army, in preparation for the inevitable day when the Western nations to whom they peddle cocaine decide to take direct military action against them.  Roper has agreed to supply the cartel with military-grade weaponry and training from experienced mercenaries, in exchange for a large shipment of cocaine, at a discount price, which Roper will then sell in Europe for an enormous profit.

Apostoll plants the suggestion in his employers' minds that Roper's normal front man, Major Corkoran, is unreliable, forcing Roper to use Pine instead. Corkoran is convinced that Pine is a plant, but cannot find any proof. While signing the paperwork Pine gathers information to convict Roper. He has also fallen in love with Roper's innocent English mistress, Jed. However, corrupt factions within both the CIA and British Intelligence are profiting from the illegal arms trade and mount their own operation, which they call 'Flagship', to scuttle Burr's sting operation. They subtly threaten Goodhew, who backs off the whole case, and betray Apostoll's status as an informant to the cartels. Before being killed, Apostoll reveals Pine's true identity to Roper under torture. Pine is held captive on Roper's yacht and tortured.

The outlines of Flagship are confessed to Burr by a drunken Harry Palfrey, the Legal Adviser to the British Secret Intelligence Service, who is privy to it all but now stricken by conscience. Burr also puts additional pressure on Palfrey by faking correspondence between himself, Goodhew, and his American partner to the effect that they know about Palfrey's duplicity, to get him to work for them. To save Pine, Burr sacrifices his operation and allows Roper to get away, by contacting Roper's "satrap," Sir Anthony Bradshaw, and bluffing that he has enough evidence to send Roper to prison with harsh consequences for any associates, but will stay his hand if Pine and Jed are released unharmed. Bradshaw and Roper fall for the deception, and Roper complies. With his life falling apart, Palfrey commits suicide.

Pine and Jed are saved. They live together in his isolated cottage at the Lanyon, a few miles from Land's End.

Continuity 
The Night Manager features the re-appearance of Harry Palfrey, the Legal Adviser to the British Secret Intelligence Service, who first appeared in The Russia House.  Sir Anthony Bradshaw previously appeared in the epilogue of The Secret Pilgrim, in which Leonard Burr also appears as the youthful Chief of the Service.

Adaptation 

On 10 January 2015, production of an adaptation was announced. Directed by Susanne Bier, the six-part serial aired on BBC One in the UK and began airing on AMC in the U.S. in April 2016. The cast includes Tom Hiddleston as Pine, Hugh Laurie as Roper, Olivia Colman as Burr, Tom Hollander as Corkoran, and Elizabeth Debicki as Jed.

An Indian streaming series adaption starting Anil Kapoor and Aditya Roy Kapoor was released in 2023 on Hotstar

References

Novels by John le Carré
1993 British novels
British spy novels
Hodder & Stoughton books
British novels adapted into television shows
Novels set in Switzerland
Novels set in Cairo